The 2009 Donington Formula Two round was the fifth round of the 2009 FIA Formula Two Championship season. It was held on 16 August 2009 at Donington Park in North West Leicestershire, United Kingdom. The first race was won by Andy Soucek, with Mikhail Aleshin and Tobias Hegewald also on the podium. The second race was won by Julien Jousse, with Kazim Vasiliauskas and Mirko Bortolotti also on the podium. Only 24 cars competed at the event, after Henry Surtees' fatal accident at Brands Hatch left a vacant slot that was unfilled.

Classification

Qualifying 1

Qualifying 2

Race 1
Weather/Track: Cloud /Dry

Race 2
Weather/Track: Bright/Dry

Standings after the race
Drivers' Championship standings

References

FIA Formula Two Championship